Julie L. Lockwood is an American ecologist who is a professor in the Department of Ecology, Evolution, and Natural Resources at Rutgers University. She is the Director of the Institute of Earth, Ocean, and Atmospheric Sciences. Her research investigates how invasive species impact natural ecosystems. In 2022, she was elected a Fellow of the American Association for the Advancement of Science.

Early life and education 
Lockwood was an undergraduate student in biology at Georgia Southern University. Her masters research investigated passerine communities. She moved to the University of Tennessee for her doctorate in zoology, where she studied the assembly of ecological communities.

Research and career 
Lockwood studies how invasive species impact their environments. She has studied how humans have impacted biodiversity, and designed interventions to slow the rate of species extinctions. Her research has contributed to the protection of native species across the United States. She served as Champion of "Rutgers Earth 2100", a research activity that will monitor regional weather dynamics as a model to manage climate change. She proposed that Earth 2100 would work with decision makers to link science to policy action, protecting the biological rich and culturally diverse communities of New Jersey.

In 2022, Lockwood was made Chair of the Rutgers University Climate Change Task Force. She was named Director of the Institute of Earth, Ocean, and Atmospheric Sciences in 2022.

Awards and honors 
 2018 Rutgers University in Research Excellence Award
 2020 Excellence in Mentoring of Graduate Students
 2020 Elected a Fellow of the Ecological Society of America
 2022 Elected a Fellow of the American Association for the Advancement of Science

Selected publications

References 

Year of birth missing (living people)
Living people
Place of birth missing (living people)
American ecologists
Georgia Southern University alumni
University of Tennessee alumni
Rutgers University faculty
Fellows of the American Association for the Advancement of Science
American women scientists
21st-century American scientists